Potassium has 26 known isotopes from  to , with the exception of still-unknown , as well as an unconfirmed report of . Three of those isotopes occur naturally: the two stable forms  (93.3%) and  (6.7%), and a very long-lived radioisotope  (0.012%)

The long half-life of this primordial radioisotope is caused by a highly spin-forbidden transition:  has a nuclear spin of 4, while both of its decay daughters are even–even isotopes with spins of 0.

In a human body of 70 kg mass, about 4,400 nuclei of  decay per second.

Minerals are dated by measurement of the concentration of potassium and the amount of radiogenic  that has accumulated. Typically, the method assumes that the rocks contained no argon at the time of formation and all subsequent radiogenic argon (i.e.) was retained.  has also been extensively used as a radioactive tracer in studies of weathering.

All other potassium isotopes have half-lives under a day, most under a minute.

Various potassium isotopes have been used for nutrient cycling studies because potassium is a macronutrient required for life.

List of isotopes 

|-
| 
| style="text-align:right" | 19
| style="text-align:right" | 12
| 
| <10 ps
| 3p
| 28S
| 
|
|

|-
| 33K
| style="text-align:right" | 19
| style="text-align:right" | 14
| 33.00756(21)#
| <25 ns
| p
| 32Ar
| 3/2+#
|
|
|-
| 34K
| style="text-align:right" | 19
| style="text-align:right" | 15
| 33.99869(21)#
| <40 ns
| p
| 33Ar
| 1+#
|
|
|-
| rowspan=2|35K
| rowspan=2 style="text-align:right" | 19
| rowspan=2 style="text-align:right" | 16
| rowspan=2|34.9880054(6)
| rowspan=2|178(8) ms
| β+ (99.63%)
| 35Ar
| rowspan=2|3/2+
| rowspan=2|
| rowspan=2|
|-
| β+, p (.37%)
| 34Cl
|-
| rowspan=3|36K
| rowspan=3 style="text-align:right" | 19
| rowspan=3 style="text-align:right" | 17
| rowspan=3|35.9813020(4)
| rowspan=3|341(3) ms
| β+ (99.95%)
| 36Ar
| rowspan=3|2+
| rowspan=3|
| rowspan=3|
|-
| β+, p (.048%)
| 35Cl
|-
| β+, α (.0034%)
| 32S
|-
| 37K
| style="text-align:right" | 19
| style="text-align:right" | 18
| 36.97337589(10)
| 1.2365(9) s
| β+
| 37Ar
| 3/2+
|
|
|-
| 38K
| style="text-align:right" | 19
| style="text-align:right" | 19
| 37.96908112(21)
| 7.636(18) min
| β+
| 38Ar
| 3+
|
|
|-
| style="text-indent:1em" | 38m1K
| colspan="3" style="text-indent:2em" | 130.50(28) keV
| 924.46(14) ms
| β+
| 38Ar
| 0+
|
|
|-
| style="text-indent:1em" | 38m2K
| colspan="3" style="text-indent:2em" | 3458.0(2) keV
| 21.95(11) μs
| IT
| 38K
| (7+)
|
|
|-
| 39K
| style="text-align:right" | 19
| style="text-align:right" | 20
| 38.963706487(5)
| colspan=3 align=center|Stable
| 3/2+
| 0.932581(44)
|
|-
| rowspan=3|40K
| rowspan=3 style="text-align:right" | 19
| rowspan=3 style="text-align:right" | 21
| rowspan=3|39.96399817(6)
| rowspan=3|1.248(3)×109 y
| β− (89.28%)
| 40Ca
| rowspan=3|4−
| rowspan=3|1.17(1)×10−4
| rowspan=3|
|-
| EC (10.72%)
| rowspan=2|40Ar
|-
|-
| β+ (0.001%)
|-
| style="text-indent:1em" | 40mK
| colspan="3" style="text-indent:2em" | 1643.639(11) keV
| 336(12) ns
| IT
| 40K
| 0+
|
|
|-
| 41K
| style="text-align:right" | 19
| style="text-align:right" | 22
| 40.961825258(4)
| colspan=3 align=center|Stable
| 3/2+
| 0.067302(44)
|
|-
| 42K
| style="text-align:right" | 19
| style="text-align:right" | 23
| 41.96240231(11)
| 12.355(7) h
| β−
| 42Ca
| 2−
|
|
|-
| 43K
| style="text-align:right" | 19
| style="text-align:right" | 24
| 42.9607347(4)
| 22.3(1) h
| β−
| 43Ca
| 3/2+
|
|
|-
| style="text-indent:1em" | 43mK
| colspan=3 style="text-indent:2em" | 738.30(6) keV
| 200(5) ns
| IT
| 43K
| 7/2−
|
|
|-
| 44K
| style="text-align:right" | 19
| style="text-align:right" | 25
| 43.9615870(5)
| 22.13(19) min
| β−
| 44Ca
| 2−
|
|
|-
| 45K
| style="text-align:right" | 19
| style="text-align:right" | 26
| 44.9606915(6)
| 17.8(6) min
| β−
| 45Ca
| 3/2+
|
|
|-
| 46K
| style="text-align:right" | 19
| style="text-align:right" | 27
| 45.9619816(8)
| 105(10) s
| β−
| 46Ca
| 2−
|
|
|-
| 47K
| style="text-align:right" | 19
| style="text-align:right" | 28
| 46.9616616(15)
| 17.50(24) s
| β−
| 47Ca
| 1/2+
|
|
|-
| rowspan=2|48K
| rowspan=2 style="text-align:right" | 19
| rowspan=2 style="text-align:right" | 29
| rowspan=2|47.9653412(8)
| rowspan=2|6.8(2) s
| β− (98.86%)
| 48Ca
| rowspan=2|1−
| rowspan=2|
| rowspan=2|
|-
| β−, n (1.14%)
| 47Ca
|-
| rowspan=2|49K
| rowspan=2 style="text-align:right" | 19
| rowspan=2 style="text-align:right" | 30
| rowspan=2|48.9682108(9)
| rowspan=2|1.26(5) s
| β−, n (86%)
| 48Ca
| rowspan=2|(3/2+)
| rowspan=2|
| rowspan=2|
|-
| β− (14%)
| 49Ca
|-
| rowspan=2|50K
| rowspan=2 style="text-align:right" | 19
| rowspan=2 style="text-align:right" | 31
| rowspan=2|49.972380(8)
| rowspan=2|472(4) ms
| β− (71%)
| 50Ca
| rowspan=2|0−
| rowspan=2|
| rowspan=2|
|-
| β−, n (29%)
| 49Ca
|-
| style="text-indent:1em" | 50mK
| colspan=3 style="text-indent:2em" | 171.4(4) keV
| 125(40) ns
| IT
| 50K
| (2−)
|
|
|-
| rowspan=2|51K
| rowspan=2 style="text-align:right" | 19
| rowspan=2 style="text-align:right" | 32
| rowspan=2|50.975828(14)
| rowspan=2|365(5) ms
| β−, n (65%)
| 50Ca
| rowspan=2|3/2+
| rowspan=2|
| rowspan=2|
|-
| β− (35%)
| 51Ca
|-
| rowspan=3|52K
| rowspan=3 style="text-align:right" | 19
| rowspan=3 style="text-align:right" | 33
| rowspan=3|51.98160(4)
| rowspan=3|110(4) ms
| β−, n (74%)
| 51Ca
| rowspan=3|2−#
| rowspan=3|
| rowspan=3|
|-
| β− (23.7%)
| 52Ca
|-
| β−, 2n (2.3%)
| 50Ca
|-
| rowspan=3|53K
| rowspan=3 style="text-align:right" | 19
| rowspan=3 style="text-align:right" | 34
| rowspan=3|52.98680(12)
| rowspan=3|30(5) ms
| β−, n (64%)
| 52Ca
| rowspan=3|(3/2+)
| rowspan=3|
| rowspan=3|
|-
| β− (26%)
| 53Ca
|-
| β−, 2n (10%)
| 51Ca
|-
| rowspan=2|54K
| rowspan=2 style="text-align:right" | 19
| rowspan=2 style="text-align:right" | 35
| rowspan=2|53.99463(64)#
| rowspan=2|10(5) ms
| β− (>99.9%)
| 54Ca
| rowspan=2|2−#
| rowspan=2|
| rowspan=2|
|-
| β−, n (<.1%)
| 53Ca
|-
| rowspan=2|55K
| rowspan=2 style="text-align:right" | 19
| rowspan=2 style="text-align:right" | 36
| rowspan=2|55.00076(75)#
| rowspan=2|3# ms
| β−
| 55Ca
| rowspan=2|3/2+#
| rowspan=2|
| rowspan=2|
|-
| β−, n
| 54Ca
|-
| rowspan=2|56K
| rowspan=2 style="text-align:right" | 19
| rowspan=2 style="text-align:right" | 37
| rowspan=2|56.00851(86)#
| rowspan=2|1# ms
| β−
| 56Ca
| rowspan=2|2−#
| rowspan=2|
| rowspan=2|
|-
| β−, n
| 55Ca
|-
| 57K
| style="text-align:right" | 19
| style="text-align:right" | 38
| 
| 
| β−
| 57Ca
| 
|
|
|-
| 59K
| style="text-align:right" | 19
| style="text-align:right" | 40
| 
| 
| β−
| 59Ca
| 
|
|

See also 
Banana equivalent dose

References 

 
Potassium
Potassium